Lee Hsuan-yen (born 13 May 1993) is a Taiwanese swimmer. He competed in the men's 200 metre breaststroke event at the 2016 Summer Olympics.

References

External links
 

1993 births
Living people
Taiwanese male swimmers
Olympic swimmers of Taiwan
Swimmers at the 2016 Summer Olympics
Place of birth missing (living people)
Swimmers at the 2014 Asian Games
Swimmers at the 2018 Asian Games
Asian Games competitors for Chinese Taipei
Taiwanese male breaststroke swimmers